Adisa is a surname. Notable people with the surname include:

Abdulkareem Adisa (died 2005), Nigerian general
Alao Fatai Adisa (born 1986), Nigerian footballer
Lawrence Adisa (born 1968), American actor, producer and writer
Opal Palmer Adisa (born 1954), Jamaican-born American poet and academic
Tunde Adisa, Nigerian para table tennis player

See also
Adisa Andwele, Barbadian poet
Asset Disposal and Information Security Alliance

Surnames of African origin